AS Saint-Etienne won Division 1 season 1968/1969 of the French Association Football League with 53 points.

Participating teams

 AC Ajaccio
 SEC Bastia
 Bordeaux
 Olympique Lyonnais
 Olympique de Marseille
 FC Metz
 AS Monaco
 FC Nantes
 OGC Nice
 Nîmes Olympique
 Red Star FC
 Stade Rennais UC
 FC Rouen
 AS Saint-Etienne
 RC Paris-Sedan
 FC Sochaux-Montbéliard
 RC Strasbourg
 US Valenciennes-Anzin

League table

Promoted from Division 2, who will play in Division 1 season 1969/1970
 Angers SCO: Champion of Division 2
 AS Angoulême: runner-up of Division 2

Results

Relegation play-offs

|}

Top goalscorers

References

 Division 1 season 1968-1969 at pari-et-gagne.com

Ligue 1 seasons
French
1